Dominik Bock (born 20 January 1995) is a German footballer who plays as a midfielder for ZFC Meuselwitz.

References

1995 births
Living people
People from Saalfeld
German footballers
Association football midfielders
FC Carl Zeiss Jena players
ZFC Meuselwitz players
Regionalliga players
3. Liga players
Footballers from Thuringia